

Land lines 
Land line phone numbers in Vietnam follow the format Area Code + Phone Number. The area codes depend on the province and/or city.

To dial a number within the same province or city, only the phone number needs to be dialed.

When dialing from a different province/city, follow the format 0 + Area Code + Phone Number.

At the moment, area codes may have from 2 to 3 digits, while phone numbers may have from 7 to 8 digits, in total, the land line phone numbers in Vietnam have 11 numbers included trunk code (0).

The different area codes are described below.

Area codes

Area code 69 
69 is the special area code dedicated for the Ministry of Defence (Vietnam) and the Ministry of Public Security (Vietnam).

Mobile telephone numbers 
 
In Vietnam, mobile phone numbers follow the format 09x-xxxxxxx or new prefixes: 03x, 05x, 07x, 08x. 
The first 0 is the trunk code.
The next 2 digits (3x, 5x, 7x, 8x or 9y) specify the mobile phone operator. Some mobile phone operators have been given more than one operator code.

In Circular No. 22/2014/TT-BTTTT dated December 22, 2014, all 11-digit mobile phone numbers will be changed into 10-digit numbers, the Ministry of Information and Communications announced in a recent press release. All 11-digit numbers with prefixes '012' of VinaPhone and MobiFone, '016' of Viettel, '018' of Vietnamobile and '019' of GMobile will be converted into 10-digit ones. To minimize possible loss of communications before, during and after network code change, each stage must consist of four steps as follows:
 Make public announcement at least 60 days before the network code change starts.
 Take technical measures to enable simultaneous dialing for 60 days since the network code change starts. Example: users may dial old or new network code 0986888888 to Viettel.
 Maintain the notification sound (since the time of simultaneous dialing closes). During this time, any call using new network codes shall be normally processed and any call using old network codes shall be routed to the notification sound.
 Stop maintaining the notification sound: Calls shall be successful processed only through new network codes. To ensure changing of network codes is quick and favorable for businesses and service users, step a aforementioned should be implemented for one stage.
In Communication of 31.V.2018 the Ministry of Information and Communications (MIC), Hanoi, announced a change on mobile telephony services, where all previous telephone numbers starting with 012x (mobile telephony services numbers) are moving into the other mobile number areas (e.g. to 07x or 08x etc.)  .

Emergency contact numbers
Used in major centers in Vietnam

 111 - Child Protection (Note: This number is rarely used because few people know it)
 112 - Lifesaving Service (Used when natural disasters occur, e.g. to find missing people and guide stray ships during storms)
 113 – Police
 114 – Fire & Rescue
 115 – Ambulance/First Aid

1900 number allocation 
1900 01XX, 1900 02XX, 1900 03XX - GTEL

1900 06XXXX - GTEL

1900 12XX, 1900 15XX, 1900 17XX, 1900 18XX - VNPT

1900 20XX, 1900 21XX, 1900 22XX - CMC Telecom

1900 54XXXX, 1900 55XXXX, 1900 56XXXX, 1900 57XXXX, 1900 58XXXX, 1900 59XXXX - VNPT

1900 63XXXX - FPT Telecom

1900 66XX, 1900 68XX - FPT Telecom

1900 70XX, 1900 71XX, 1900 72XX - SPT

1900 75XXXX, 1900 77XXXX - SPT

1900 80XX, 1900 86XX, 1900 89XX - Viettel

1900 90XX, 1900 92XX, 1900 94XX - Viettel

1900 96XXXX - Viettel

Previous area codes not currently in use 
120 – Mobifone
121 – Mobifone
122 – Mobifone
123 – Vinaphone
124 – Vinaphone
125 – Vinaphone
126 – Mobifone
127 – Vinaphone
128 – Mobifone
129 – Vinaphone
162 – Viettel
163 – Viettel
164 – Viettel
165 – Viettel
166 – Viettel
167 – Viettel
168 – Viettel
169 – Viettel
186 – Vietnamobile
188 – Vietnamobile
199 – Gmobile
20 – Lào Cai Province (discontinued)
 210 – Phú Thọ Province
 211 – Vĩnh Phúc Province
 218 – Hòa Bình Province
 219 – Hà Giang Province
 22 – Sơn La Province (discontinued)
 230 – Điện Biên Province (discontinued)
 231 – Lai Châu Province  (discontinued)
 240 – Bắc Giang Province (discontinued)
 241 – Bắc Ninh Province (discontinued)
 25 – Lạng Sơn Province (discontinued)
 26 – Cao Bằng Province (discontinued)
 27 – Tuyên Quang Province (discontinued)
 280 – Thái Nguyên Province (discontinued)
 281 – Bắc Kạn Province (discontinued)
 29 – Yên Bái Province (discontinued)
 30 – Ninh Bình Province (discontinued)
 31 – Hai Phong city (discontinued)
 320 – Hải Dương Province (discontinued)
 321 – Hưng Yên Province (discontinued)
 33 – Quảng Ninh Province (discontinued)
 350 – Nam Định Province (discontinued)
 351 – Hà Nam Province (discontinued)
 36 – Thái Bình Province (discontinued)
 37 – Thanh Hóa Province (discontinued)
 38 – Nghệ An Province (discontinued)
 39 – Hà Tĩnh Province (discontinued)
 4 – Hanoi (discontinued)
 500 – Đắk Lắk Province (discontinued)
 501 – Đắk Nông Province (discontinued)
 510 – Quảng Nam Province (discontinued)
 511 – Da Nang city (discontinued)
 52 – Quảng Bình Province (discontinued)
 53 – Quảng Trị Province (discontinued)
 54 – Thừa Thiên–Huế Province (discontinued)
 55 – Quảng Ngãi Province (discontinued)
 56 – Bình Định Province (discontinued)
 57 – Phú Yên Province (discontinued)
 58 – Khánh Hòa Province (discontinued)
 59 – Gia Lai Province (discontinued)
 60 – Kon Tum Province (discontinued)
 61 – Đồng Nai Province (discontinued)
 62 – Bình Thuận Province (discontinued)
 63 – Lâm Đồng Province (discontinued)
 64 – Bà Rịa–Vũng Tàu province (discontinued)
 650 – Bình Dương Province (discontinued)
 651 – Bình Phước Province (discontinued)
 66 – Tây Ninh Province (discontinued)
 67 – Đồng Tháp Province (discontinued)
 68 – Ninh Thuận Province (discontinued)
 70 – Vĩnh Long Province (discontinued)
 710 – Cần Thơ city (discontinued)
 711 – Hậu Giang Province (discontinued)
 72 – Long An Province (discontinued)
 73 – Tiền Giang Province (discontinued)
 74 – Trà Vinh Province (discontinued)
 75 – Bến Tre Province (discontinued)
 76 – An Giang Province (discontinued)
 77 – Kiên Giang Province (discontinued)
 780 – Cà Mau Province (discontinued)
 781 – Bạc Liêu Province (discontinued)
 79 – Sóc Trăng Province (discontinued)
 8 – Ho Chi Minh City (discontinued)
992 – VSAT

References

ITU allocation data

Vietnam
Telecommunications in Vietnam
Telephone numbers